Nyceryx brevis is a moth of the  family Sphingidae. It is known from Brazil.

The length of the forewings is 20–22 mm. It is the smallest Nyceryx species.

References

Nyceryx
Moths described in 2001